Puttakun Narin is a Thai footballer.

He previously played for Thai Port F.C. in Thai Premier League.

References
Player Profile on Thai Premier League
Player Profile on Goal.com
Player Profile on 7M
Player Profile on SMM Online
Player Profile on Mundeenee
Player Profile on Ohozaa

1992 births
Living people
Puttakun Narin
Puttakun Narin
Puttakun Narin
Puttakun Narin
Puttakun Narin
Association football forwards